Hamamelis virginiana, known as witch-hazel, common witch-hazel, and American witch-hazel, is a species of flowering shrub native to eastern North America, from Nova Scotia west to Minnesota, and south to central Florida to eastern Texas.

Description
It is a small, deciduous tree or shrub growing up to 6 m (rarely to 10 m) tall, often with a dense cluster of stems from its base. The bark is light brown, smooth, scaly, inner bark reddish purple. The branchlets are pubescent at first, later smooth, light orange brown, marked with occasional white dots, finally dark or reddish brown. The foliage buds are acute, slightly falcate, downy, light brown. The young leaves open involute, covered with stellate rusty down; when full grown, they are dark green above, and paler beneath. In fall, they turn yellow with rusty spots. The leaf stipules are lanceolate, acute; they fall soon after the leaf expands.

The flower calyx is deeply four-parted, very downy, orange brown within, imbricate in bud, persistent, cohering with the base of the ovary. Two or three bractlets appear at base. It can be distinguished from the related Hamamelis vernalis by its flowering in fall, not winter.

Ecology
H. virginiana is a pollinator plant that attracts moths and supports 62 species of caterpillars.

Uses

Native Americans produced witch hazel extract by boiling the stems of the shrub and producing a decoction, which was used to treat swellings, inflammations, and tumors.  Early Puritan settlers in New England adopted this remedy from the natives, and its use became widely established in the United States.

An extract of the plant is used in the astringent witch hazel.

H. virginiana produces a specific kind of tannins called hamamelitannins. One of those substances displays a specific cytotoxic activity against colon cancer cells.

The bark and leaves were used by Native Americans in the treatment of external inflammations. Pond's Extract was a popular distillation of the bark in dilute alcohol.

The wood is light reddish brown, sapwood nearly white; heavy, hard, close-grained, with a density of 0.68.

The forked twigs of witch-hazel are preferred as divining rods.

References

External links

 

Plants used in traditional Native American medicine
Hamamelidaceae
Trees of the Southeastern United States
Trees of the Northeastern United States
Plants described in 1753
Taxa named by Carl Linnaeus
Trees of the Great Lakes region (North America)